"Say I'm Your Number One" (also formatted as "Say I'm Your No. 1") is a song by English singer Princess, released in 1985 as the lead single from her self-titled debut studio album (1986). Written and produced by Stock Aitken Waterman (SAW), the song peaked at number seven on the UK Singles Chart. In the United States, it reached number 20 on Billboard Hot Black Singles chart. British magazine Classic Pop ranked the song number 8 in their list of "Top 40 Stock Aitken Waterman songs" in 2021.

Background 
Session singer Desiree Heslop – later to take the stage name Princess – was hired by SAW to workshop some "credible" soul-pop tracks, after distinguishing herself as a backing vocalist on the Brilliant album Kiss The Lips of Life.

“I was a singer who had come in to do a job, and had differentiated myself on a part that the other singer wasn’t getting," the vocalist remembered of winning over SAW. "So they sent the other lady home."

Matt Aitken says the track is a very rare example of a song written by SAW that first came together without a particular artist or project in mind.

According to Princess and her brother/manager Don Heslop, SAW provided them with a number of basic, unfinished tracks for them to choose from and to help develop, including one that later became "Say I'm Your Number One". Mike Stock remembers specifically choosing the track for the vocalist, writing "I thought it would be fine for Desiree."

After a conversation between Don Heslop and producer Pete Waterman, the manager says a plan was floated to collaborate on material between them that could potentially garner a record deal. "What he wanted to do, and what I wanted to do seemed to be written by the same author," said Heslop. "We talked about doing something amazing and taking it to the majors." Waterman recalled of the conversation: "... I'd said that Desiree was only a session singer and has just been paid to sing on something we were working on for Dee C Lee."

Speaking on the genesis of the track, Waterman stated he gave Mike Stock and Matt Aitken a brief to write a song that women could mime to men they were attracted to, as the song was played in nightclubs. Among the guide tracks that influenced production was "Genie" by B.B. & Q. Band.

While Stock Aitken Waterman are solely credited as the writers of the song, Princess says she contributed to the lyrics and structure of the song during the demo process. Despite the track initially being intended for Lee, Princess felt the evolution of the song under her guidance meant it was effectively always hers. "It was always mine because I did the sensibility and the feeling of the song, and how it morphed from the demo," she said. "I was almost entwined in the song – we co-wrote the bridge, and all the BVs were mine, and to a certain extent, Don’s influence."

When the record was finished, no major label would pick up it up, and the snub helped inspire the creation of Supreme Records, which released the track and then became an ongoing vehicle for SAW's output. Initial buzz around the track was created by servicing it to pirate radio, and pressing white label copies to create the impression it was an American import.

The video for the song, which featured the singer journeying around London, was designed to highlight the Britishness of the record by including cultural icons such as double-decker buses, and the singer's bowler hat.

"Say I'm Your Number One" was Princess' biggest hit single. Although the first of a run of four hit singles that the artist released with SAW, it proved to be her only top 10 entry in her home country.

The music of "Say I'm Your Number One" was interpolated with Bananarama's "A Trick of the Night" for the latter song's Number One Mix, the U.K. single remix, and related variations.

Track listings
7-inch single
A. "Say I'm Your Number One" – 3:38
B. "Say I'm Your Number One" (Senza Voce) – 4:30

12-inch single
A. "Say I'm Your Number One" (Full Length Version) – 6:20
B1. "Say I'm Your Number One" (Short Version) – 5:42
B2. "Say I'm Your Number One" (Senza Voce) – 3:00

"After the Love Has Gone / Say I'm Your Number One"
A. "After the Love Had Gone" – 6:48
B. "Say I'm Your Number One" – 6:14

Charts

Weekly charts

Year-end charts

References

1985 singles
1985 songs
Next Plateau Entertainment singles
Song recordings produced by Stock Aitken Waterman
Songs written by Matt Aitken
Songs written by Mike Stock (musician)
Songs written by Pete Waterman
Supreme Records singles
Princess (singer) songs